Hebraism [ˈhiːbreɪz(ə)m] is a lexical item, usage or trait characteristic of the Hebrew language. By successive extension it is often applied to the Jewish people, their faith, national ideology or culture.

Idiomatic Hebrew
Hebrew has many idiomatic terms that are not easily translatable to other languages, for example בארבע עיניים be'arba enayim, literally 'with four eyes,' means face to face without the presence of a third person, as in, 'The two men met with four eyes.' The expression לא דובים ולא יער lo dubim ve lo ya'ar is literally "neither bears nor forest" but means that something is completely false. The saying טמן את ידו בצלחת taman et yado batsalakhat "buried his hand in the dish" means that someone idles away his time."

Lexical items deriving from Hebrew
"Hebraism" may also refer to a lexical item with Hebrew etymology, i.e. that (ultimately) derives from Hebrew. For example, the English word stiff-necked, meaning "stubborn", is a calque of Greek σκληροτράχηλος, which is a calque of Hebrew קשה עורף qeshēh ʿōref "hard of neck; stubborn". Similar calques are the way of women (דרך נשים) "menstruation" and flowing with milk and honey (זבת חלב ודבש) "abundance".

Sometimes Hebraisms can be coined using non-Hebrew structure. For example, the Yiddish lexical item ישיבה בחור yeshive bokher, meaning "Yeshivah student", uses a Germanic structure but two Hebrew lexical items.

Distinctive language 
Beyond simple etymology, both spoken and written Hebrew is marked by peculiar linguistic elements that distinguish its semitic roots. This hebraism includes word order, chiasmus, compound prepositions, and numerous other distinctive features.

Systematic Hebraisms
Finally, the word "hebraism" describes a quality, character, nature, or method of thought, or system of religion attributed to the Hebrew people. It is in this sense that Matthew Arnold (1869) contrasted Hebraism with Hellenism, identifying Thomas Carlyle as his age's embodiment of the former. Feldman's response to Arnold expands on this usage.

See also

Christian Hebraist
Hebraist
List of English words of Hebrew origin

Notes

Further reading

Hebrew language
Jewish culture
Orientalism by type
Semitic studies